María Ribera (born 8 July 1986) is a Spanish rugby sevens player. She competes for the Spanish women's national rugby sevens team and was included in their squad to the 2016 Summer Olympics. She was also part of the team that won the final Olympic qualification tournament in Dublin, Ireland.

Ribera also played at the 2013 Rugby World Cup Sevens in Russia.

References

External links 
 

1986 births
Living people
Spain international women's rugby union players
Spain international women's rugby sevens players
Olympic rugby sevens players of Spain
Rugby sevens players at the 2016 Summer Olympics
Sportspeople from Badajoz